This is a list of baronetcies in the Baronetage of Nova Scotia. These were first created in 1624, and were replaced by the Baronetage of Great Britain in 1707.

This page lists baronetcies, whether extant, extinct, dormant (D), unproven (U), under review (R), abeyant, or forfeit, in the Baronetage of Nova Scotia.

The holders of some of the baronetcies listed on the list have died but in each case, up to the present, no person has proved succession and thus been placed upon the Official Roll of the Baronetage. Those that are marked with a "Dormant" in the penultimate column are regarded as being dormant since, although heirs are known to exist, succession has not been proved within a period of five years from the death of the holder.

A baronetcy becomes extinct when heirs cannot be traced and are believed not to exist. In this case it should not be listed on the Official Roll but would be re-activated should an heir subsequently emerge.

The Royal Warrant of Edward VII of 8 February 1910 states "no person whose name is not entered on the Official Roll shall be received as a Baronet, or shall be addressed or mentioned by that title in any civil or military Commission, Letters Patent or other official document".

The list below is not corroborated by The Standing Council of the Baronetage or the Ministry of Justice.

A

B

C

D

E

F

G

H

I-J

K

L

M

N

O

P

R

S

T

V-W

See also
List of extant Baronetcies
List of baronetcies in the Baronetage of Ireland
List of baronetcies in the Baronetage of England
List of baronetcies in the Baronetage of the United Kingdom
List of baronetcies in the Baronetage of Great Britain

References

External links
Baronetcies to which no Succession has been proved

Canadian baronets
Nova Scotia

Baronetcies